WMO Arts & Science College is a higher education institution in Kalpetta, Wayanad. Affiliated to the University of Calicut.

Accreditation and affiliation
College is accredited by National Accreditation and Assessment CouncilNAAC and affiliated to University of Calicut.

Courses
 PG Courses
 M Sc Physics
 M Sc Maths
 M Sc Statistics
 M A Arabic
 M A English

 UG Courses
 Bachelor of Computer Application
 B Sc Physics
 B Sc Mathematics
 B Sc Chemistry
 B Sc Electronics
 B A English
 B Com Computer Application
 B Com Cooperation

See also

References

External links

University of Calicut
University Grants Commission
National Assessment and Accreditation Council

Universities and colleges in Wayanad district